Erixon is a surname. Notable people with the surname include:

 Christofer Erixon Swedish songwriter and composer
 Dick Erixon (born 1962), Swedish writer
 Fredrik Erixon, Swedish economist
 Jan Erixon (born 1962), Swedish ice hockey player
 Sebastian Erixon (born 1989), Swedish ice hockey player
 Stefan Erixon (born 1977), Swedish bandy player
 Tim Erixon (born 1991), Swedish ice hockey player